American Residential Services (ARS) is a United States network of plumbing, and home and commercial heating and air conditioning (HVAC) businesses, operating under the trade name ARS/Rescue Rooter. The trade name came from the acquisition and merging of ARS and Rescue Rooter by their then-parent company ServiceMaster. They have locations in 24 states. The company is based in Memphis, Tennessee. The ARS mascots are Dandy and his sidekick Pronto.

History
ARS was established in 1975. The name "Rescue Rooter" was trademarked in 1976 by the California-based Rescue Industries Inc. It was a family-owned West Coast plumbing and drain cleaning company.  In 1996, ARS was founded to consolidate local and regional HVAC service companies. Shortly after, The Servicemaster Company, based in Downers Grove, Illinois, acquired both Rescue Rooter and ARS, in 1998 and 1999 respectively, and brought them together under the "ARS/Service Express" brand. The company eventually dropped the "Service Express brand and the parent brand was known primarily as “ARS/Rescue Rooter.” 

In October 2006, ARS/Rescue Rooter was then acquired from ServiceMaster by two private equity firms, Caxton-Iseman Capital and Royal Palm Capital Partners, for $100 million. In May 2014, ARS was acquired by Charlesbank Capital Partners from Caxton-Iseman Capital and Royal Palm Capital Partners.

References

Further reading

External links
 Official website
 Rescue Rooter website

Heating, ventilation, and air conditioning
Companies based in Memphis, Tennessee
Plumbing
Service companies of the United States
Privately held companies based in Tennessee